Leinsdorf may refer to:
 Erich Leinsdorf, Austrian conductor
 Count Leinsdorf, a character in Robert Musil's novel The Man Without Qualities